Juice is a 2017 Indian Hindi-language drama short film directed by first-time director Neeraj Ghaywan and produced by Lalit Prem Sharma. Exploring the theme of gender inequality, it stars Shefali Shah as Manju Singh, a woman who is hosting a get-together of families along with her husband Brijesh (Manish Chaudhari) during a particularly hot evening. The film released to critical acclaim for its subject, direction and particularly Shah's performance. It won two Filmfare Short Film Awards at the 63rd Filmfare Awards, including Best Short Film (Fiction) and Best Actress in a Short Film for Shah.

Plot 
On a particularly hot evening, Brijesh and Manju Singh are hosting a get-together of families. While the men stay in the living room conversing about everyday issues, the women are in the kitchen, fixing a meal for their husbands.

Cast
The film's cast is as follows:
Shefali Shah as	Manju Singh
Manish Chaudhari as	Brijesh Singh
Kiran Khoje as	Parbhatiya (Maid)
Raviza Chauhan as	Rajni Shukla
Shreedhar Dubey as	Abhay Shukla
Kanika Dang as Sarla Dubey
Chitranjan Tripathi as Utpal Dubey
Pubali Sanyal as Puja Sanyal
Suman Mukhopadhyay as Shubodeep Sanyal
Shahnawaz Pradhan as Faiz Khan

Production
Ghaywan conceived the idea for the script on his own memories of watching the dynamics between men and women in his own house as a child. He said,

Themes
Reema Roy, a scholar from Asutosh College, said Juice "exposed the misogyny hidden in the bone marrow of our male-dominated society". The journal Annals of the Romanian Society for Cell Biology asserts the film shows the "power which the patriarchy exhibits on the other" where "women are supposed to live a life of adjustment".

India Todays Nisha Singh calls the film "a commentary on how women are treated at their homes, irrespective of which strata of the society one belongs to."

Release

The film was released on 22 November 2017 by Royal Stag Barrel Select Large Short Films.

Reception

Critical response
Juice opened to critical acclaim and notice. Pradeep Menon wrote of the film, "It is a simple, engaging film, one that’s completely worth your time because Shefali Shah powers the film with her words as well as her silence." Kriti Tulsiani of News18 called it "a powerful short film" which provides "an unfazed if taciturn look at the normalized patriarchy and misogyny in middle-class Indian homes". According to Hindustan Times, "Neeraj creates the perfect stage for traditional misogyny almost in-built in our blood." Suresh Mathew of The Quint praised it as a "must watch film" which "takes an unyielding and cold look at the way patriarchy operates in our homes". Scroll.in noted the film's use of subtext.

Shah's lead performance won positive notice. Menon commended how she "emotes primarily through her expressions" and "makes light work of showing us her reluctant patience, her building frustration and eventual release". Mathew said, "Shefali Shah, as always, hits it out of the park with her stellar performance. Her silence speaks volumes."

Accolades
The film won two Filmfare Short Film Awards at the 63rd Filmfare Awards:
Best Short Film (Fiction) - Neeraj Ghaywan
Best Actress in a Short Film - Shefali Shah.

References

External links 

Juice on YouTube
Juice on Large Short Films

Films about women in India
Indian feminist films
2017 short films
2010s Hindi-language films
2017 drama films
2010s feminist films
Indian short films
Indian direct-to-video films
2017 direct-to-video films
2017 films
Direct-to-video drama films